During the 2005–06 season, Sampdoria dropped to 12th position in the Coppa Italia and failed to progress from the UEFA Cup's Group's stage.

Kit
Sampdoria's kit was manufactured by Kappa and sponsored by ERG.

Players

First-team squad
Squad at end of season

Left club during season

Transfers

In
 Luca Castellazzi - Brescia, free
 Marco Zamboni - Reggina, loan
 Bruno Mota - Chiasso, loan
 Andrea Gasbarroni - Palermo, loan
 Samuele Dalla Bona - Milan, loan
 Mattia Marchesetti - Cremonese, loan
 Gianluca Di Gennaro - Torino, free
 Luigi Sala - Atalanta
 Emiliano Bonazzoli - Reggina, loan
 Paolo Castellazzi - Torino, free
 Mark Iuliano - Mallorca
 Gionata Mingozzi - Perugia
 Cristian Zenoni - Juventus, free

Competitions

Serie A

References

U.C. Sampdoria seasons
Sampdoria